Great Trees of London is a list created by Trees for Cities after the Great Storm of 1987, when the general public were asked to suggest suitable trees. Forty-one were chosen, with a further 20 added in 2008. In 2010, Time Out Guides Limited published a book, 'The Great Trees of London', listing all 61 trees.

List of the Trees

Original 41

20 added in 2008

See also 
List of individual trees
List of Great British Trees

References

External links 

Forests and woodlands of the United Kingdom
Trees
British
British

1987 in the United Kingdom